“Kiss Kiss, Bang Bangalore” is the seventeenth episode of the seventeenth season of the American animated television series The Simpsons. It originally aired on the Fox network in the United States on April 9, 2006. Dan Castellaneta & Deb Lacusta were nominated for a Writers Guild of America Award for Outstanding Writing in Animation at the 59th Writers Guild of America Awards for their script to this episode.

Plot
On movie night at the nuclear power plant, Homer learns that the plant is being shut down and outsourced to India. After Homer is sent to train the new employees, he becomes power-hungry and is given a self-help book, The Cereal Is the Prize, by Marge for the plane ride. Arriving in India, he seeks help from Apu's cousin Kavi on help with outsourcing. Homer is able to spur the "natives" into a working frenzy — the natives, at first not understanding his confusing speech, assume that if they cheer, they will be allowed to go back to work. Homer, Smithers, and Mr. Burns get a positive albeit slightly inaccurate impression from this, and Homer is put in total charge of the power plant while Burns takes time off to have fun floating down the Ganges with corpses he has befriended. Homer, left in charge of a slightly-overgrown nuclear power plant on a river in the middle of nowhere, appraises the Hindu deities and decides he might be a god himself. About a week later, Lenny and Carl come to the India plant, invited by a card claiming that Homer is to become a god.

Soon, the rest of the Simpson family, worried about Homer, travel to India and, with Burns, journey upriver on a PBR boat and find that Homer is ruling the plant like a god. Horrified, Marge and the kids tell the plant workers that Homer is not a god. They cheerfully explain that they already know, and that they worship him because of the American workplace routines he has instituted, like coffee breaks, early retirement, personal days, and "muffin baskets and mylar balloons on your birthday!". It is revealed that Homer has instituted these routines in the workers' binding contracts, treating the workers as good human beings in exchange for their help for outsourcing the power to Springfield, much to Marge’s relief. Lisa then admits that she is proud of Homer for outsourcing the American worker's sense of entitlement and privilege. However, Mr. Burns calls this “madness” and decides to close down the plant and move it to an area where workers are "more desperate and ignorant" — Springfield. He then fires all the workers; however, this makes the workers delighted due to the various firing clauses Homer has written into their contracts ("Golden parachutes for all!").

Meanwhile, back in Springfield, Patty and Selma meet their Hollywood heart-throb, Richard Dean Anderson, who played MacGyver, who stops by to ask for directions to a convention about his newest show Stargate SG-1, only to find that he is totally uninterested in MacGyver and only did it for the pay. Patty and Selma kidnap Anderson from his Stargate SG-1 convention and tie him to a chair. From there, he manages to escape by using one of his contact lenses to focus the sunlight and burning the ropes, only to discover that he loves escaping, and starts having Patty and Selma put him through increasingly complex MacGyver-esque kidnapping trials. Patty and Selma eventually tire of Anderson's antics, and decide to drive him away. They sit him down one night and show him slides of their vacation to the horse-drawn carriage museum in Alberta, Canada. Anderson is so overwhelmed with boredom he jumps out the window for good. However, Patty and Selma later manage to track him down to India and join the Simpson’s family.

Cultural references

The title is taken from the 2005 film Kiss Kiss Bang Bang.  A small part of the episode is a reference to Indiana Jones. For example, the way Homer dresses is referent to what Mola Ram wears in the film Indiana Jones and the Temple of Doom. As well, the people chant to Homer in a similar way as they do for Mola Ram in the film, and the India portion of the episode is similar to Temple of Doom overall. The scene in which the Simpsons along with Smithers and Burns travel up the river is a direct reference to the PT boat in Apocalypse Now and the Indians' apparent worship of Homer is also a reference to this film as well as the song "The End" by The Doors. There is also a part in the episode where Homer pulls out a cutout of Mac Tonight.

The Dixieland Band plays an instrumental of "Alexander's Ragtime Band" By Irving Berlin. The song sung at the end of the episode is Kishore Kumar's "Pal bhar ke liye" from the 1970 Indian blockbuster Johny Mera Naam, starring Dev Anand and Hema Malini.

Although it is never mentioned by name, the horse-drawn carriage museum in Alberta is the Remington Carriage Museum in Cardston, Alberta. The slides that Patty and Selma show depict the museum's main building, a statue of the museum's founder, Don Remington, and several carriages in their collection. When the episode first aired, museum officials said they were honored by the reference, even if it was in the context of boring summer vacations.

References

External links 
 

The Simpsons (season 17) episodes
2006 American television episodes
Television episodes set in India